Billanook College is an independent co-ed school with an early learning program through to Year 12, located in Mooroolbark, Melbourne, Victoria, Australia. It operates in association with the Uniting Church in Australia (but is not governed or managed by the Church) and is a member of Round Square. It was founded in 1980 by the founding principal Peter Harris. The college's current principal is Roger Oates.

Billanook College is named after the name the local Wurundjeri people called the area, on which the college now stands.

Billanook College is a member of the Eastern Independent Schools of Melbourne. EISM member schools in the same area regularly play each other in sporting activities ranging from Cricket, Tennis, Basketball, Soccer, Field Hockey and Australian Rules Football to Badminton and Table Tennis. Billanook College hosts the local VET Media and Music course as it has since 2004.

Facilities 
The college has recently begun an ambitious building program and since 2009 have constructed several new buildings, including The Alan Ross Centre (The ARC), a 475-seat auditorium named after the college's long-serving former principal, Alan Ross, who served from 1997 to 2009. The new Junior Early Learning Centre was opened in 2010 and four new fully equipped science laboratories were also opened in mid 2010.

On 28 January 2016, Billanook College opened its $1.8 million Discovery Centre building.

About a year later Billanook opened the Mastery Centre for students from Year 7 to 9.

They're now looking into refurbishing Senior School, and then the Performing Arts Section of the college.

Grounds 
Billanook College has expansive grounds including two full sized ovals, one half size oval, a large gym, three basketball courts and a volleyball court.

In conjunction with Yarra Valley winemakers Billanook College has developed its own working vineyard and Viticulture Skills Centre on the school property, which first produced 68 bottles of their first vintage in 2004.

Sport 
Billanook is a member of the Eastern Independent Schools of Melbourne (EISM).

EISM Premierships 
Billanook has won the following EISM senior premierships.

Combined:

 Swimming (2) - 1998, 2000

Boys:

 Badminton - 2013
 Basketball (4) - 1998, 2002, 2003, 2006
 Football (3) - 1998, 1999, 2003
 Handball - 2004
 Hockey - 2019
 Indoor Soccer - 2005
 Swimming (3) - 1999, 2000, 2001
 Table Tennis - 2000
 Tennis - 2005
 Volleyball (16) - 2000, 2001, 2002, 2003, 2004, 2005, 2008, 2009, 2010, 2011, 2012, 2013, 2014, 2015, 2017, 2018

Girls:

 Basketball (4) - 2001, 2002, 2003, 2005
 Cricket (2) - 2000, 2006
 Cross Country - 1999
 Football (5) - 2004, 2005, 2013, 2015, 2016
 Hockey (3) - 1998, 1999, 2000
 Indoor Cricket (6) - 2007, 2010, 2011, 2012, 2013, 2021
 Soccer (2) - 1998, 2009
 Softball (6) - 2005, 2006, 2007, 2008, 2013, 2019
 Volleyball (10) - 2006, 2008, 2009, 2010, 2011, 2012, 2013, 2018, 2019, 2020

Notable alumni
Simon Clarke - Professional road bicycle racer
 Tony D'Alberto - Professional race car driver
 Julian de Stoop - Fox Sports News AFL Correspondent
 Daniel Hargraves - former AFL player for the Western Bulldogs and the Fremantle Football Club
 Trent Lowe   -  Professional road bicycle racer
 Daniel Merriweather - 2005 ARIA Winner (Best Urban Release) - R&B artist - 2009 ARIA Winner (Best Male Artist)
Damian Monkhorst - former AFL player for the Collingwood Football Club and the St Kilda Football Club, and current assistant coach for the Hawthorn Football Club
 Stephanie Payne - Writer, blogger, public servant, charity fundraiser and activist
 Paul Sanderson - Australian Men's Professional Volleyball Player
 Brodie Young -  Big Brother Australia contestant / Channel 9 Quizmania host, Ground Announcer at Olympic Park Stadium

See also 
 List of schools in Victoria
 List of high schools in Victoria
 Victorian Certificate of Education

References

External links 
 

Round Square schools
Educational institutions established in 1980
Private schools in Victoria (Australia)
Eastern Independent Schools of Melbourne
Junior School Heads Association of Australia Member Schools
Uniting Church schools in Australia
Private schools in Melbourne
1980 establishments in Australia
Buildings and structures in the Shire of Yarra Ranges